Spring Lake Community Center is a national historic site located at 4184 Spring Lake Highway, Spring Lake, Florida in Hernando County.

It was added to the National Register of Historic Places on October 20, 2009.

References

External links
Hernando Sun article on the Community Center

National Register of Historic Places in Hernando County, Florida
Works Progress Administration in Florida